Daithí Cooney (born 1954) is an Irish retired hurler who played as a goalkeeper for the Cork senior team.

Cooney joined the team during the 1982 championship and was a regular member of the extended panel until his retirement after the 1983 championship. During that time he won two Munster medals as a non-playing substitute. Cooney was an All-Ireland runner-up on two occasions.

At club level Cooney enjoyed a lengthy career with Youghal.

His brother, Christy Cooney, served as President of the Gaelic Athletic Association between 2009 and 2012.

References

1954 births
Living people
Youghal hurlers
Cork inter-county hurlers
People from Youghal